Cooperation for a Green Future is a non-profit foundation in the Republic of Georgia working to identify and assess environmental problems, and develop and implement innovative solutions. 

Their work focuses on environmental issues within the context of physical and social processes and structures. The organization seeks to create and spread within the Georgian public a common vision for a socially progressive and ecologically sustainable society, identify potential pathways toward realizing this vision, and implement specific projects and tasks in this direction. Currently, the organization conducts projects to mitigate the effects of lead pollution, to encourage the use of public transport, and to facilitate the implementation of industrial ecology practices in Georgia.

External links
Cooperation for a Green Future - official website

Environmental organisations based in Georgia (country)